WXCY (1510 AM) is a commercial radio station licensed to Salem, New Jersey, and serving the southern part of Greater Philadelphia, including Wilmington, Delaware. It broadcasts a country music radio format, simulcasting WXCY-FM 103.7 Havre de Grace, Maryland. WXCY is owned and operated by Forever Media.

The station is heard around the clock on its FM translator in Wilmington, W245CJ, broadcasting at 96.9 FM.

History
The station signed on in 1966 as WJIC ("Jersey Information Center") airing middle of the road (MOR) music and information. From 1981 to the early 1990s, WJIC featured a country music format as "Just Country WJIC", then changed to a talk radio and information format, calling itself "News/Talk 1510."

On October 1, 1997, WJIC, which was co-owned with WNNN on 101.7 FM, took over the FM station's religious format as Faith 1510 and adopted the WNNN call sign. On May 3, 2001, the call letters were changed to WFAI. The FM call letters were later switched to WJKS.

In December 2014, QC Communications sold WFAI and WJKS for $3.2 million to Delmarva Broadcasting Company, a subsidiary of Lancaster, Pennsylvania-based Steinman Enterprises. In February 2019, Delmarva Broadcasting Company was acquired by Forever Media. On October 24, 2019, WFAI flipped to urban adult contemporary, branded as Jammin' 96.9, which is simulcast on translator W245CJ. It also changed its calls to WVJJ. WVJJ is also heard on the HD3 channel of WSTW, Wilmington.

On January 1, 2021, WVJJ changed their format from urban adult contemporary to a simulcast of country-formatted WXCY-FM 103.7 FM Havre de Grace, Maryland, under new WXCY call letters.

References

External links

XCY (AM)
Salem County, New Jersey
XCY (AM)
Country radio stations in the United States